A Satanist is an adherent of Satanism.

Satanist may also refer to:

Literature
The Satanist (Wheatley novel), a 1960 spy horror novel by Dennis Wheatley
The Satanist, a 1912 gothic novel by Mrs Hugh Fraser

Music
The Satanist (album), an album by the Polish extreme metal band Behemoth
"Satanist", a song by Swedish band The Crown from the album Crowned In Terror

See also

Satanism (disambiguation)
Satan (disambiguation)